Gymnoscelis crassifemur is a moth in the family Geometridae. It was described by William Warren in 1906. It is endemic to New Guinea. Its hindwings are violet while its abdomen and thorax are green.

References

Moths described in 1906
crassifemur
Endemic fauna of New Guinea